Věra Jourová (born 18 August 1964) is a Czech politician and lawyer who has been the Vice President of the European Commission for Values and Transparency since 1 December 2019 and previously served as the European Commissioner for Justice, Consumers and Gender Equality from 2014 to 2019. She served as a Member of the Chamber of Deputies between 2013 and 2014 and as the Czech Minister for Regional Development in 2014.

In 2019, Time magazine ranked Jourová in its list of 100 most influential people of the year, citing her role in the adoption of the General Data Protection Regulation and new privacy rights as European Commissioner.

Early life and education
Jourová grew up in Třebíč, a small town in which her parents, a kindergarten teacher and caterer, ran a folk troupe. She studied cultural anthropology at Charles University in Prague, while raising two children. Upon graduation, she returned to work in Třebíč's local council.

Career in the public sector
Jourová served as secretary and spokesperson of the Municipal Office of Třebíč, Vysočina Region, Czech Republic, from 1995 until 2000 and as Head of the Department of Regional Development for the Vysočina Region from 2001 to 2003. She entered national politics when she was tapped to work as Deputy Head of the Ministry of Regional Development, where she led the European Integration Section until March 2006. Her responsibilities included leading the Czech team that negotiated EU funds with the European Commission and European Investment Bank as well as managing EU funds in the Czech Republic.

In October 2006, Jourová was accused of accepting a 2 million Kč bribe from Ladislav Péťa, mayor of Budišov, South Moravia, for securing EU subsidies to the reconstruction of the Budišov Chateau. Although she was fully exonerated, she spent more than a month in pre-trial detention, which "brought divorce and anguish to her family". Her prosecution was halted in mid-2008, when the police came forward and said that the bribery had never happened.

Between 2006 and 2013, Jourová was an independent consultant providing advice on EU matters to the Czech Republic, Romania, Germany, Belarus, Latvia, Estonia, North Macedonia, Serbia, Montenegro, and Moldova.

Political career

Career in national politics
Jourová has been a member of the ANO political party since 2012, and since 2013, she has been the movement's deputy chairwoman. She was elected as a Member of the Chamber of Deputies of the Parliament in October 2013, and became Minister for Regional Development in January 2014 in the government of Bohuslav Sobotka. Her popularity ratings remained consistently high, helping to drive the party to second place in the 2013 national elections and to victory in the 2014 European elections.

Member of the European Commission, 2014–present 

In July 2014, the three parties in the Czech government agreed that the country's next European commissioner should be Jourová. At the time, there was speculation she would vie for the important posts of European Commissioner for Regional Policy or the European Commissioner for Internal Market and Services.

After an EU Parliament hearing she was confirmed as the European Union's Commissioner for Justice, Consumers and Gender Equality as a part of the Juncker Commission. The Corporate Europe Observatory "expressed serious doubts" about her possible conflicts of interest due to her ties with ANO Chairman Andrej Babiš, who is also the Czech Finance Minister and a billionaire businessman. Her party, ANO, belongs to the Alliance of Liberals and Democrats for Europe in the European Parliament.

Her responsibilities include gender equality, judicial cooperation within the EU, and privacy concerns, including concluding negotiations on a comprehensive EU-U.S. Safe Harbor Agreement and working with the Vice-President for the Digital Single Market Andrus Ansip to pass "EU data protection reform and by modernis[e] and simplify[] consumer rules for online and digital purchases". In addition, her portfolio includes "overseeing remuneration rules across the City of London, enforcing EU pay curbs and bonus caps", something that was explicitly carved out of Jonathan Hill's portfolio as Commissioner for Financial Stability, Financial Services and Capital Markets Union "amid concerns that members of the European Parliament will try to veto his appointment". In 2018, Jourová was put in charge of drafting rules to assess the independence and functioning of a country's judicial system as a condition for receiving funds from the budget of the European Union.

Jourová said that Germany acted "according to the rules" regarding Spain's extradition request for Catalan president Carles Puigdemont.

Following the 2019 European elections, Babiš nominated Jourová for a second term in the European Commission.

In April 2021, Jourová was included in a list of eight public officials that were banned by Russia's Ministry of Foreign Affairs from entering the country in retaliation for EU sanctions on Russians.

Controversy
Some MEPs have expressed concern over Jourová's affiliation to controversial billionaire-turned politician Andrej Babiš and his political movement ANO.

References

External links

 Věra Jourová profile at idnes.cz 
 

|-

|-

1964 births
ANO 2011 MPs
Czech Social Democratic Party politicians
Czech European Commissioners
Regional Development ministers of the Czech Republic
Living people
Women European Commissioners
Women government ministers of the Czech Republic
21st-century Czech women politicians
ANO 2011 Government ministers
Charles University alumni
Politicians from Třebíč
Female justice ministers
European Commissioners 2014–2019
European Commissioners 2019–2024
Members of the Chamber of Deputies of the Czech Republic (2013–2017)